This is a list of 111 genera in the family Baetidae, small minnow mayflies.

Baetidae genera

 Acanthiops  c g
 Acentrella Bengtsson, 1912 i c g b
 Acerobiella  c g
 Acerpenna Waltz & McCafferty, 1987 i c g b
 Acetrella  g
 Adebrotus  c g
 Adnoptilum  c g
 Afrobaetodes  c g
 Afroptilum  c g
 Alainites  c g
 Americabaetis Kluge, 1992 i c g
 Anafroptilum Kluge, 2011 c g b
 Andesiops  c g
 Apobaetis Day, 1955 i c g
 Asiobaetodes  c g
 Aturbina  c g
 Baetiella Ueno, 1931 i c g
 Baetis Leach, 1815 i c g b
 Baetodes Needham and Murphy, 1924 i c g
 Baetopus Keffermüller, 1960 i c g
 Barbaetis Waltz and McCafferty, 1985 i c g
 Barnumus  c g
 Bugilliesia  c g
 Bungona  c g
 Callibaetis Eaton, 1881 i c g b
 Camelobaetidius Demoulin, 1966 i c g b
 Centroptiloides  c g
 Centroptilum Eaton, 1869 i c g b
 Chane  c g
 Cheleocloeon  c g
 Chopralla  c g
 Cloeodes Traver, 1938 i c g
 Cloeon Leach, 1815 i c g b
 Corinnella  c g
 Crassabwa  c g
 Cryptonympha  c g
 Cymbalcloeon Suttinun, Gattolliat & Boonsoong, 2020
 Dabulamanzia  c g
 Delouardus  c g
 Demoreptus  c g
 Demoulinia  c g
 Dicentroptilum  c g
 Diphetor Waltz & McCafferty, 1987 i c g b
 Echinobaetis  c g
 Edmulmeatus  c g
 Edmundsiops  c g
 Fallceon Waltz & McCafferty, 1987 i c g b  (blue-winged olives)
 Glossidion  c g
 Gratia  c g
 Guajirolus Flowers, 1985 i c g
 Guloptiloides  c g
 Harpagobaetis  c g
 Herbrossus  c g
 Heterocloeon McDunnough, 1925 i c g b
 Indobaetis  c g
 Indocloeon  c g
 Iswaeon McCafferty & Webb, 2005 i b
 Jubabaetis  c g
 Kirmaushenkreena  c g
 Kivuiops  c g
 Labiobaetis Novikova & Kluge, 1987 i c g b
 Liebebiella  c g
 Lugoiops McCafferty and Baumgardner, 2003 i c g
 Madaechinopus  c g
 Mayobaetis Waltz and McCafferty, 1985 i c g
 Mesobaetis Brauer, Redtenbacher & Ganglbauer, 1889 g
 Micksiops  c g
 Moribaetis Waltz and McCafferty, 1985 i c g
 Mutelocloeon  c g
 Mystaxiops  c g
 Nanomis  c g
 Nesoptiloides  c g
 Nigrobaetis  c g
 Offadens  c g
 Ophelmatostoma  c g
 Palaeocloeon Kluge, 1997 g
 Papuanatula  c g
 Paracloeodes Day, 1955 i c g b
 Parakari  c g
 Peuhlella  c g
 Platybaetis  c g
 Plauditus Lugo-Ortiz & McCafferty, 1998 i c g b
 Prebaetodes  c g
 Procloeon Bengtsson, 1915 i c g b
 Promatsumura  c g
 Pseudocentroptiloides Jacob, 1986 i c g
 Pseudocentroptilum  c g
 Pseudocloeon Klapalek, 1905 i c g
 Pseudopannota  c g
 Raptobaetopus  c g
 Rheoptilum  c g
 Rhithrocloeon  c g
 Rivudiva  c g
 Scutoptilum  c g
 Securiops  c g
 Spiritiops  c g
 Susua  c g
 Symbiocloeon  c g
 Takobia  c g
 Tanzaniops  c g
 Tenuibaetis  c g
 Thraulobaetodes  c g
 Tomedontus  c g
 Tupiara  c g
 Varipes Lugo-Ortiz and McCafferty, 1998 i c g
 † Vetuformosa Poinar, 2011 g
 Waltzohyphius Lugo-Ortiz & McCafferty, 1995 g
 Waltzoyphius  c g
 Waynokiops  c g
 Xyrodromeus  c g
 Zelusia  c g

Data sources: i = ITIS, c = Catalogue of Life, g = GBIF, b = Bugguide.net

References